is a Japanese footballer currently playing as a defender for SC Sagamihara, on loan from Tochigi SC.

Career statistics

Club
.

Notes

References

External links

1998 births
Living people
Tokai University alumni
Japanese footballers
Association football defenders
J2 League players
J3 League players
Tochigi SC players
SC Sagamihara players